Diana Richardson (born January 16, 1983) is an American politician who served as a member of the New York Assembly. She was elected on the Working Families Party line in a 2015 special election to replace Karim Camara in the 43rd district, which comprises the Crown Heights and Prospect Lefferts Gardens neighborhoods of Brooklyn.

Early life and education
Richardson was born in Brooklyn, to Caribbean immigrant parents from Aruba, and raised in Crown Heights.

Richardson has an undergraduate degree in public administration from Medgar Evers College, and a Master of Public Administration from Baruch College, both campuses of the City University of New York.

Career
Richardson was a Brooklyn Community Board 9 member when the Crown Heights Tenant Union, an advocacy organization for tenants that organizes, educations, and helps residents in housing court cases, convinced her to run for an open New York Assembly seat on an anti-gentrification platform.

She won the May 2015 special election, on the Working Families Party (WFP) ballot line, the first to do so in the state legislature. She also won the general election the following November, on both the Democratic Party line as well as the WFP.

In 2016, Richardson was arrested for hitting her 12-year-old son with a broomstick and was charged with assault, endangering the welfare of a child, criminal possession of a weapon and menacing. The felony charge was dropped in April 2017, though she still faced six misdemeanor charges.

In 2020, Richardson was pepper-sprayed by the New York City Police Department while marching at a demonstration over the murder of George Floyd.

Richardson faced a primary challenge in the 2020 elections from Jesse Hamilton. She defeated Hamilton in a landslide.

In January 2022, Brooklyn Borough President Antonio Reynoso selected Richardson to be the deputy borough president.

On October 17, 2022, Richardson was fired for hosting a toxic work environment following a string of staff and constituent complaints about her behavior while working at Borough Hall.

References

External links

Living people
Politicians from Brooklyn
Medgar Evers College alumni
Baruch College alumni
African-American state legislators in New York (state)
Working Families Party politicians
Democratic Party members of the New York State Assembly
Women state legislators in New York (state)
21st-century American politicians
21st-century American women politicians
American people of Aruban descent
1987 births
21st-century African-American women
21st-century African-American politicians
20th-century African-American people
20th-century African-American women